The following highways are numbered 7. For roads numbered A7, see list of A7 roads.

Route 7, or Highway 7, may refer to:

International
 Asian Highway 7
 European route E07 
 European route E007

Afghanistan
Kunduz-Khomri Highway (A7)

Albania
 National Road 7 (Albania) Road in Albania, from Rrogozhine to Elbasan

Argentina
 National Route 7

Australia

New South Wales 
 Westlink M7 Motorway (Sydney)

Queensland 

Clem Jones Tunnel (Brisbane)
Airport Link (Brisbane)
 Ipswich Road, Queensland
 Ipswich Motorway, Queensland
 
Carnarvon Highway, Queensland
Dawson Highway, Queensland
Gregory Highway, Queensland
Capricorn Highway, Queensland
 Fitzroy Developmental Road, Queensland (Regional)
 Robina Parkway, Queensland (Gold Coast)

Tasmania 
 West Tamar Highway, Tasmania

Western Australia 
 Leach Highway, Western Australia

Austria
 Mühlkreis Autobahn

Belarus
 M7 highway (Belarus)

Bulgaria
 I-7 road (Bulgaria)

Cambodia
 National Highway 7 (Cambodia)

Canada
 Alberta Highway 7
 British Columbia Highway 7
 Manitoba Highway 7
 New Brunswick Route 7
 Northwest Territories Highway 7
 Nova Scotia Trunk 7
 Ontario Highway 7
 York Regional Road 7 in Ontario
 Prince Edward Island Route 7
 Saskatchewan Highway 7
 Yukon Highway 7

China
  G7 Expressway

Czech Republic
 D7 Motorway
 I/7 Highway (in Czech)

Djibouti
  RN-7 (Djibouti)

Dominican Republic
  DR-7

Eswatini
MR7 road

Finland
Finnish national road 7

France
 Route nationale 7

Germany
 Bundesautobahn 7
 Bundesstraße 7

Greece
 Greek National Road 7

Hong Kong
 Route 7 (Hong Kong)

Hungary
 M7 motorway (Hungary)
 Main road 7 (Hungary)

India
 
State Highway 7 (Andhra Pradesh)
State Highway 7 (Karnataka)
State Highway 7 (Kerala)

Indonesia
 Indonesian National Route 7

Iraq
 Highway 7 (Iraq)

Iran
 Freeway 7 (Iran)

Ireland
N7 road, part of which is designated as M7 motorway

Israel
 Highway 7 (Israel)

Italy
 Autostrada A7
 RA 7
 State road 7

Japan

 Yokohama Northwest Route

Korea, South
 National Route 7

Malaysia
 Malaysia Federal Route 7

New Zealand
 New Zealand State Highway 7
 New Zealand State Highway 7A

Norway
 Norwegian National Road 7

Paraguay
 National Route 7

Philippines
 Radial Road 7
 N7 highway (Philippines)

Poland
 National road 7
 Expressway S7

Romania
 Drumul Naţional 7
 Drumul Național 7A
 Drumul Naţional 7C - Transfăgărășan
 A7 motorway (Romania)

Russia
 M7 highway (Russia)

South Africa
 M7 (Port Elizabeth)

United Kingdom
 A7 road (Great Britain)
 A7 road (Northern Ireland)

United States
 Interstate 7 (proposed)
 U.S. Route 7
 New England Interstate Route 7 (former)
 Alabama State Route 7
 Alaska Route 7
 Arkansas Highway 7
 California State Route 7
 County Route S7 (California)
 Colorado State Highway 7
 Delaware Route 7
 Florida State Road 7
 Georgia State Route 7
 Idaho State Highway 7
 Illinois Route 7
 Indiana State Road 7
 Iowa Highway 7
 K-7 (Kansas highway)
 Kentucky Route 7
 Louisiana State Route 7 (former)
 Maine State Route 7
 Maryland Route 7
 M-7 (Michigan highway) (former)
 Minnesota State Highway 7
 County Road 7 (Anoka County, Minnesota)
 County Road 7 (Goodhue County, Minnesota)
 County Road 7 (St. Louis County, Minnesota)
 Mississippi Highway 7
 Missouri Route 7
 Montana Highway 7
 Nebraska Highway 7
 Nevada State Route 7 (former)
 New Jersey Route 7
 County Route 7 (Monmouth County, New Jersey)
 County Route 7 (Ocean County, New Jersey)
 New Mexico State Road 7
 New York State Route 7
 County Route 7 (Allegany County, New York)
 County Route 7 (Chemung County, New York)
 County Route 7 (Columbia County, New York)
 County Route 7 (Delaware County, New York)
 County Route 7 (Dutchess County, New York)
 County Route 7 (Franklin County, New York)
 County Route 7 (Genesee County, New York)
 County Route 7 (Greene County, New York)
 County Route 7 (Herkimer County, New York)
 County Route 7 (Jefferson County, New York)
 County Route 7 (Livingston County, New York)
 County Route 7 (Niagara County, New York)
 County Route 7 (Onondaga County, New York)
 County Route 7 (Orange County, New York)
 County Route 7 (Oswego County, New York)
 County Route 7 (Rensselaer County, New York)
 County Route 7 (Saratoga County, New York)
 County Route 7 (Schoharie County, New York)
 County Route 7 (St. Lawrence County, New York)
 County Route 7 (Suffolk County, New York)
 County Route 7 (Tioga County, New York)
 County Route 7 (Ulster County, New York)
 County Route 7 (Warren County, New York)
 County Route 7 (Wyoming County, New York)
 North Carolina Highway 7
 North Dakota Highway 7 (former)
 Ohio State Route 7
 Oklahoma State Highway 7
 Oklahoma State Highway 7D
 Oregon Route 7
 Pennsylvania Route 7 (former)
 Rhode Island Route 7
 South Carolina Highway 7
 Tennessee State Route 7
 Texas State Highway 7
 Texas State Highway Loop 7
 Texas Park Road 7
 Farm to Market Road 7 (former)
 Texas Recreational Road 7
 Utah State Route 7
 Utah State Route 7 (1912-1977) (former)
 Virginia State Route 7
 Washington State Route 7
 Washington State Highway 7 (former)
 West Virginia Route 7

Territories
 Guam Highway 7

Uruguay 
  Route 7 Gral. Aparicio Saravia

See also 
 List of A7 roads
 List of highways numbered 7A
 List of highways numbered 7B
 List of highways numbered 7C